Alexandre Louis "Alex" Servais (2 March 1896 – 17 December 1949) was a Luxembourgian sprinter. He competed in the men's 100 metres at the 1920 Summer Olympics.

References

1896 births
1949 deaths
Athletes (track and field) at the 1920 Summer Olympics
Luxembourgian male sprinters
Luxembourgian male javelin throwers
Olympic athletes of Luxembourg
Sportspeople from Luxembourg City
Presidents of the Luxembourg Tennis Federation